Makoto is a Japanese given name.

Makoto may also refer to:

Makoto (game), a single-player aerobic electronic game
Makoto (Street Fighter), a fictional character in the Street Fighter series
Makoto, the name of one of the Megatokyo servers as well as one of the characters in the Megatokyo omake Grand Theft Colo: Otaku City